Season 1986–87 was the 103rd football season in which Dumbarton competed at a Scottish national level, entering the Scottish Football League for the 81st time, the Scottish Cup for the 92nd time and the Scottish League Cup for the 40th time.

Overview 
Dumbarton began another First Division campaign with a new manager at the helm - Alex Totten - who had been released from his duties with Rangers following the arrival of Graeme Souness. Following another league reconstruction, the First Division clubs would play each other 4 times - a big ask particularly for the part-time clubs - but as things turned out it was to be a close thing for promotion with Dumbarton always up with the front runners. In the end, it was to be a 3rd-place finish - just 4 points behind champions Morton.

In the Scottish Cup, it would be another early exit for Dumbarton, this time to Brechin City after a draw, in the third round.

In the League Cup, Stirling Albion were dispatched in the second round before a fighting display against Celtic, saw Dumbarton's interest in the competition come to an end for another year.

Locally, Dumbarton failed to keep a grip on the Stirlingshire Cup, with Stirling Albion gaining some revenge for their League Cup exit, with a semi final win.

Results & fixtures

Scottish First Division

Skol Cup

SHEG Scottish Cup

Stirlingshire Cup

Pre-season matches

League table

Player statistics

Squad 

|}

International caps
Owen Coyle was selected to play for the Republic of Ireland Under 21 team in matches against Scotland on 17 February played at Easter Road and against Belgium on 28 April.

Transfers

Players in

Players out

Reserve Team
Dumbarton competed in the Scottish Reserve League (West).

Trivia
 The League match against Clyde on 15 November marked Gordon Arthur's 100th appearance for Dumbarton in all national competitions - the 92nd Dumbarton player to reach this milestone.
 Dumbarton ended the season managerless - Alex Totten having been appointed at St Johnstone, and with the death of chairman and benefactor Sir Hugh Fraser, the club would face severe financial challenges in the coming season.

See also
 1986–87 in Scottish football

References

External links
Billy Traynor (Dumbarton Football Club Historical Archive)
Jim McNeil (Dumbarton Football Club Historical Archive)
Scottish Football Historical Archive

Dumbarton F.C. seasons
Scottish football clubs 1986–87 season